Dubovoy is a rural locality (a khutor) in Boldyrevskoye Rural Settlement, Ostrogozhsky District, Voronezh Oblast, Russia. The population was 496 as of 2010. There are 2 streets.

Geography 
Dubovoy is located 37 km north of Ostrogozhsk (the district's administrative centre) by road. Boldyrevka is the nearest rural locality.

References 

Rural localities in Ostrogozhsky District